Love Is All Around (simplified Chinese: 爱在你左右) is a Chinese drama which was co-produced by Media Prima Berhad and MediaCorp TV. It was screened on every weekday night at 9:45 pm. It was telecasted on Malaysia's ntv7 channel and later, was telecasted on Singapore's free-to-air channel, MediaCorp Channel 8. This drama serial consists of 26 episodes. In Singapore, it made its debut on 18 August 2008 and ended on 22 September 2008, and was screened on every weekday night at 7:00 pm.

Synopsis
Fu Xiaoyue (Apple Hong) is a tourist guide in a tourism company. She has been dating with Andrew Yap for almost a year. She always dreamed to marry with Andrew and hence she enter a competition and won a wedding package.

Zhuang Jiawei (Wee Kheng Ming) is in love with Yang Kaiqi (Brenda Chiah) for seven years. On that day, Jiawei's mom organise a birthday party for his girlfriend. Kaiqi celebrate her birthday and bought opera tickets for Jiawei's mom.

She entered a pageant beauty contest but later disqualified because she lied about her age. After that, Jiawei decided to go a vacation with her in Penang. Incidental, Xiaoyue is the tourist guide of the trip. His boyfriend is also there for work.

Xiaoyue is very happy and she want to have a romantic dinner with Andrew. But she is shocked to see Andrew and a girl in his room.

Kaiqi left Jiawei for her job and her boss, Mr Ma. Her boss gave her another chance but in return, she must become a "prostitute" for him and she eventually agreed, causing a deep heartbreak to Jiawei. Jiawei and Xiaoque meet each other when they are in the same tour group to Penang. After going through a scary hostage incident, they find strength for each other and fall in love. However, their love is not smooth sailing.

Cast

The Zhuang Family

The Fu Family

Other cast

Airing dates

External links
Love Is All Around Official Website (ntv7)
Love Is All Around (MediaCorp TV Channel 8)

Chinese-language drama television series in Malaysia
Singapore Chinese dramas
Singapore–Malaysia television co-productions
2007 Malaysian television series debuts
2008 Malaysian television series endings
2007 Singaporean television series debuts
2008 Singaporean television series endings
NTV7 original programming
Channel 8 (Singapore) original programming